The Communauté urbaine Grand Paris Seine et Oise is the communauté urbaine, an intercommunal structure, covering the western suburbs of Paris. It is located in the Yvelines department, in the Île-de-France region, northern France. It was created in January 2016 by the merger of the previous communautés d'agglomération Mantes-en-Yvelines, Deux Rives de la Seine, Poissy-Achères-Conflans-Sainte-Honorine, Seine & Vexin and the communautés de communes Coteaux du Vexin and Seine-Mauldre. Its area is 504.7 km2. Its population was 417,556 in 2018. Its seat is in Aubergenville.

Composition
The communauté urbaine consists of the following 73 communes:

Achères
Les Alluets-le-Roi
Andrésy
Arnouville-lès-Mantes
Aubergenville
Auffreville-Brasseuil
Aulnay-sur-Mauldre
Boinville-en-Mantois
Bouafle
Breuil-Bois-Robert
Brueil-en-Vexin
Buchelay
Carrières-sous-Poissy
Chanteloup-les-Vignes
Chapet
Conflans-Sainte-Honorine
Drocourt
Ecquevilly
Épône
Évecquemont
La Falaise
Favrieux
Flacourt
Flins-sur-Seine
Follainville-Dennemont
Fontenay-Mauvoisin
Fontenay-Saint-Père
Gaillon-sur-Montcient
Gargenville
Goussonville
Guernes
Guerville
Guitrancourt
Hardricourt
Hargeville
Issou
Jambville
Jouy-Mauvoisin
Jumeauville
Juziers
Lainville-en-Vexin
Limay
Magnanville
Mantes-la-Jolie
Mantes-la-Ville
Médan
Méricourt
Meulan-en-Yvelines
Mézières-sur-Seine
Mézy-sur-Seine
Montalet-le-Bois
Morainvilliers
Mousseaux-sur-Seine
Les Mureaux
Nézel
Oinville-sur-Montcient
Orgeval
Perdreauville
Poissy
Porcheville
Rolleboise
Rosny-sur-Seine
Sailly
Saint-Martin-la-Garenne
Soindres
Le Tertre-Saint-Denis
Tessancourt-sur-Aubette
Triel-sur-Seine
Vaux-sur-Seine
Verneuil-sur-Seine
Vernouillet
Vert
Villennes-sur-Seine

References

Grand Paris Seine et Oise
Grand Paris Seine et Oise